Alice de Chambrier (28 September 1861 – 20 December 1882) was a Swiss poet. She died from a diabetic coma at age 21, and her masterpiece is Au-delà, an anthology of poems published by Philippe Godet.

Biography
Alice de Chambrier was born on 28 September 1861 in Neuchâtel, to Alfred de Chambrier and Sophie de Sandol-Roy, belonging to a family who played some part in public affairs at the time.

She was only one year old when she lost her mother. She grew up in Neuchâtel; vivacity and gentleness was her nature.

She spent all her life in Neuchâtel, except 18 months during which she travelled to Darmstadt, between 1876 and 1877. She desired to live some time abroad in order to learn German; she learnt it so swiftly that she lost no time in finishing composing some allegorical playlet in German verses to be played by her schoolmates.

Back from Darmstadt, the vivacious child had become a young lady who, under the mask of good manners, calm and even temper, was concealing powerful feelings and an extraordinary sensitiveness.

She did not write her first work until she was 17.

She attended a girls' school, called l'Ecole Supérieure des Jeunes Demoiselles, where her first compositions acquired some popularity. Especially, her poem the Atlandide (Atlantis, in English) telling the ancient legend of the lost continent swallowed up by the sea, was recited in a public performance, by the actress Madame Ernst.

Since this event, she has been considered as a poet; and the very day her father authorised her to give herself to poetry she felt fulfilled and declared that her life was now shadowlessly happy.

She received precious advice from Madame Breton, née Samson, the daughter of the famous tragedian, and from the Actress Mme Agar who performed in Racine's masterpiece. It was the performances of this tragedian and her affection that really decided the career of the young author. She wrote a number of works, not only poems, but also comedies, dramas, and short stories. She won a lot of awards in various contests, the first of all in 1880 for the 'Phare de Cordouan' at the Académie des Muses Santones, in Rouen. She also gained a primevère d'argent during the spring of 1882 from the Académie des Jeux floraux in Toulouse for her ballad La Belle au Bois dormant (the sleeping beauty), but was so shy that she could not read it in public.

Her library was rather tiny, and only consisted of some magazines, a few historical books, and 'la légende des siècles' by Victor Hugo. She did not imitate anybody's style in her verses, but presented herself truly and naïvely.

Her piety was sincere and without affectation. She looked after poor or ill people devotedly, and called on a sick woman just four days before dying; even her parents ignored this self-sacrificing.

She died as she lived, silently.

Major works 
 Atlantide, May 1880
 Belladonna, in Trois Nouvelles : Verena, Belladonna, Cendrillon, par M. S. Framel, Alice de Chambrier et F. Guillemet, Lausanne, Arthur Imer, 1882
 Au-delà,1883
 Le Chatelard de Bevaix dans le Musée neuchâtelois, 1884.
 Œuvres poétiques, Neuchâtel, éditions de la Baconnière, 1972
 Sibylle ou le Chatelard de Bevaix, Genève, 1983
 Légendes et récits, Liminaire, Genève, 1990
 Poèmes choisis, Lausanne, éditions L'Âge d'Homme, 1998
 Oh ! Laissez-moi chanter..., 2004

Bibliography 
Henry Barbier, Alice de Chambrier et son œuvre littéraire, éd. Cahors, 1937, 24 p. (In-8°)
Service pour la promotion de l'égalité entre homme et femme, Pionnières et créatrices en Suisse romande, XIXe et XXe siècles, Genève, Slatkine, 2004

External links 
 Notice d'un choix de poèmes
 Alice de Chambrier at WikiSource 

Swiss women poets
Poètes maudits
1861 births
1882 deaths
Deaths from diabetes
19th-century Swiss poets
19th-century Swiss women writers
19th-century Swiss writers
Swiss poets in French
People from Neuchâtel